The 2014–15 Grambling State Tigers men's basketball team represented Grambling State University during the 2014–15 NCAA Division I men's basketball season. The Tigers, led by first year head coach Shawn Walker, played their home games at the Fredrick C. Hobdy Assembly Center and were members of the Southwestern Athletic Conference.

The Tigers finished the season with a record of 2–27, losing all 18 regular-season conference games and their game in the first round of the conference tournament. The team's only two victories on the season were over non-NCAA teams: Lyon College of the NAIA and Selma University of the NCCAA. It was the second season out of three in which the team finished winless in NCAA games, after it went 0–28 in 2012–13.

The team finished the season last out of NCAA Division I's 351 teams in points scored per game, at 52.0. The team drew a total of only 3,454 fans to the Frederick C. Hobdy Assembly Center for its 11 home games, an average of 314 per game.

Roster

Schedule

|-
!colspan=9 style="background:#000000; color:#D9D919;"| Regular season

|-
!colspan=9 style="background:#000000; color:#D9D919;"| SWAC tournament

References

Grambling State Tigers men's basketball seasons
Grambling State
Grambling State Tigers men's basketball
Grambling State Tigers men's basketball